The 59th Filmfare Awards were held to honor the best films of 2013 from the Hindi-language film industry (commonly known as Bollywood). The nominations were announced on 13 January 2014. The ceremony that was held on 24 January 2014 (telecasted on 26 January 2014) was hosted by Priyanka Chopra and Ranbir Kapoor.

Yeh Jawaani Hai Deewani led the ceremony with 10 nominations, followed by Aashiqui 2, Bhaag Milkha Bhaag, Goliyon Ki Raasleela Ram-Leela and Raanjhanaa with 8 nominations each.

Bhaag Milkha Bhaag won 6 awards, including Best Film, Best Director (for Rakeysh Omprakash Mehra) and Best Actor (for Farhan Akhtar), thus becoming the most-awarded film at the ceremony.

Deepika Padukone received triple nominations for Best Actress for her performances in Chennai Express, Goliyon Ki Raasleela Ram-Leela and Yeh Jawaani Hai Deewani, winning for Goliyon Ki Raasleela Ram-Leela.

Real-life couple Pankaj Kapur and Supriya Pathak were both nominated for Best Supporting Actor and Best Supporting Actress respectively, for their performances in Matru Ki Bijlee Ka Mandola and Goliyon Ki Raasleela Ram-Leela, with Pathak winning her category.

Winners and Nominees
The nominees for the 59th Filmfare Awards were announced on 13 January 2014.

Awards

Main Awards

Critics' awards

Technical Awards
{| class="wikitable"
|-
!Best Story
!Best Screenplay
|-
|
Subhash Kapoor – Jolly LLB
Anand Gandhi, Pankaj Kumar & Kushboo Ranka - Ship of ThesuesJaideep Sahni - Shuddh Desi RomanceRitesh Batra - The LunchboxRitesh Shah -  BA Pass |
Chetan Bhagat, Abhishek Kapoor, Supratik Sen & Pubali Chaudhari – Kai Po Che!Nikkhil Advani, Ritesh Shah, Suresh Nair & Niranjan Iyengar – D-Day Somnath Dey & Subhendu Bhattacharya – Madras CafeNeeraj Pandey – Special 26Subhash Kapoor – Jolly LLB|-
!Best Dialogue
!Best Editing
|-
|
Subhash Kapoor – Jolly LLBFarhad-Sajid – Chennai ExpressJaideep Sahni – Shuddh Desi RomanceNeeraj Pandey – Special 26Sameer Gautam Singh-Shahid|
Aarif Sheikh – D-DayChandrashekhar Prajapati – Madras CafeDeepa Bhatia – Kai Po Che!John F Lyons – The LunchboxShree Narayan Singh – Special 26|-
!Best Choreography
!Best Cinematography
|-
|
Samir & Arsh Tanna – "Lahu Muh Lag Gaya" from Goliyon Ki Raasleela Ram-Leela|
Kamaljeet Negi – Madras Cafe|-
!Best Production Design
!Best Sound Design
|-
|
Acropolis Design – Bhaag Milkha Bhaag|
Bishwadeep Chatterjee and Nihar Ranjan Samal – Madras Cafe|-
!Best Costume Design
!Best Background Score
|-
|
Dolly Ahluwalia – Bhaag Milkha Bhaag|
Hitesh Sonik – Kai Po Che!|-
!Best Special Effects
!Best Action
|-
|
Tata Elxsi – Dhoom 3|
Thomas Struthers & Guru Bachchan – D-Day|-
|}

Special awards

Multiple Nominations and Awards
The following films received multiple nominations.
 10 nominations: Yeh Jawaani Hai Deewani 8 nominations: Aashiqui 2, Bhaag Milkha Bhaag, Goliyon Ki Raasleela Ram-Leela, Raanjhanaa 7 nominations: Chennai Express 6 nominations: Kai Po Che! 4 nominations: Lootera 3 nominations: Krrish 3The following films received multiple awards.
 6 wins: Bhaag Milkha Bhaag 3 wins: Goliyon Ki Raasleela Ram-Leela 2 wins: Aashiqui 2, D-Day, Jolly LLB, Kai Po Che!, Madras Cafe, The Lunchbox''

References

External links

Filmfare Awards
2014 Indian film awards